Larne Harbour railway station, Larne, County Antrim, Northern Ireland, serves the ferry port for ferries to Cairnryan. There are also occasional sailings to Douglas, Isle of Man in conjunction with the Isle of Man TT. Sailings to Cairnryan are operated by conventional ships and several crossings a day operate in each direction throughout the year.

The station co-exists with the passenger terminus for P&O Ferries ferries offering simple integration for foot passengers. However, this situation is not mirrored at the Scottish terminus of Cairnryan, where the nearest railway station, is five miles from Cairnryan ferry terminal.

The station was opened on 1 October 1862. It was improved in 1890 by Berkeley Deane Wise to a budget of £3,000, with a double faced platform, one side serving the broad gauge line from Belfast and the other the narrow gauge from Ballymena, and a clock with two minute hands showing both English and Irish time, which was 25 minutes later.

Service
This station is the final outbound terminus for services on the Larne Line.

Some of those peak services start and terminate at the nearby  station instead. During weekdays the first train leaves here at 6:05am and the last train arrives at 12:20am.

On Sundays the service to Great Victoria Street reduces to operating every two hours.

References

Railway stations in County Antrim
Railway stations serving harbours and ports in the United Kingdom
Railway stations served by NI Railways
Transport in Larne
Railway stations opened in 1862
Buildings and structures in Larne
Railway stations serving harbours and ports in Ireland
1862 establishments in Ireland
Railway stations in Northern Ireland opened in the 19th century